Luis Henry Campos Cruz (born 10 November 1995) is a Peruvian racewalker. He competed at the 2016 Summer Olympics in the men's 50 kilometres walk but did not finish the race. In 2019, he competed in the men's 20 kilometres walk at the 2019 World Athletics Championships held in Doha, Qatar. He finished in 29th place.

References

1995 births
Living people
Peruvian male racewalkers
Olympic athletes of Peru
Athletes (track and field) at the 2016 Summer Olympics
Athletes (track and field) at the 2020 Summer Olympics
Athletes (track and field) at the 2018 South American Games
South American Games silver medalists for Peru
South American Games medalists in athletics
Athletes (track and field) at the 2019 Pan American Games
Pan American Games competitors for Peru
21st-century Peruvian people